Two lake freighters have shared the name John Sherwin:
 , U.S. propeller, bulk freighter, Official No. 202910, scrapped in 1974.
 , U.S. propeller, bulk freighter, Official No. 276445, laid up in Sturgeon Bay, Wisconsin.

References

Ship names